Piper mestonii, commonly known as Queensland long pepper or simply long pepper, is an evergreen vine in the pepper family Piperaceae native to rainforests of New Guinea and Queensland, Australia.

Description
The leaves are narrowly ovate to broadly ovate. The apex is acuminate and the base cuneate to cordate. There are 2 or 3 pairs of lateral veins, all of which divert from the midvein in the basal portion of the leaf.

This species is dioecious, meaning that functionally female and functionally male flowers are borne on separate plants. Female inflorescences are erect cylindrical spikes produced in the leaf axils or opposite to a leaf. The male flowers have not been described.

The fruit is an infructescence, that is, a mass consisting of the combined fruit of the individual flowers in the inflorescence, like the pineapple and mulberry. When mature it is bright red and fleshy.

Phenology
Flowering has been recorded in September and April. The fruits ripen between August and October.

Taxonomy
In 1889 the Queensland Government sponsored an expedition to the Bellenden Ker Range with the aim of documenting as much of the natural flora and fauna as possible. It was led by the explorer and journalist Archibald Meston and he was accompanied by, among others, the Queensland colonial botanist Frederick Manson Bailey. It was during this expedition that Bailey collected specimens of this species at Harvey Creek, a tributary of the Russell River, and it was first described by Bailey in his contribution to the book Report of the Government Scientific Expedition to the Bellenden-Ker Range.

Etymology
The species epithet mestonii was given by Bailey (as "mestoni") in a tribute to Meston.

Distribution and habitat
In New Guinea Piper mestonii is found in most parts of the island.

Conservation
This species is listed by the Queensland Department of Environment and Science as near threatened but no justification for the assessment is published. The distribution of the species in Queensland is extremely small, which may be a factor in the assessment. , it has not been assessed by the IUCN.

Gallery

References

External links
 
 
 View a map of historical sightings of this species at the Australasian Virtual Herbarium
 View observations of this species on iNaturalist
 View images of this species on Flickriver

mestonii
Flora of Queensland
Flora of New Guinea
Taxa named by Frederick Manson Bailey
Plants described in 1889